Pax Leksikon is a Norwegian political encyclopedia published in six volumes by the Norwegian publishing house Pax Forlag from 1978 to 1981.

Editors were Hans Fredrik Dahl, Jon Elster, Irene Iversen, Siri Nørve, Tor Inge Romøren, Rune Slagstad and Mariken Vaa. More than 400 experts contributed to the encyclopedia.

The encyclopedia has been made available online.

List of volumes
This is a list of the six volumes of the encyclopedia Pax Leksikon ( for all volumes 1–6).

Volume 1: A-B. Published 1978
Volume 2: C-G. Published 1979
Volume 3: H-Ks. Published 1979
Volume 4: Ku-N. Published 1980
Volume 5: O-Sn. Published 1980
Volume 6: So-Å. Published 1981

References

External links
 Online version.

Norwegian encyclopedias
Pax Forlag books
1978 non-fiction books
20th-century encyclopedias